Many Doraemon video games were released for most video game systems in Japan.

Other platforms

Many LCD handhelds, such as Dokodemo Dorayaki Doraemon, were also released.

Super Cassette Vision

Doraemon Nobita's Time Machine the Great Adventure

Virtual Boy
Doraemon: Nobita no Doki Doki! Obake Land (cancelled)

Arcade
Doraemon no Eawase Montage (cancelled)
Doraemon's Anywhere Door / Doraemon no Dokodemodoa

and more...

Game Boy Advance

Doraemon Board Game

Wii
Doraemon Wii

Wii U
Fujiko F. Fujio Characters Daishuugou! SF Dotabata Party!!

Sega Mega Drive
Doraemon Yume Dorobou to 7 Nin No Gozans

Sega Saturn
Doraemon: Nobita to Fukkatsu no Hoshi

Dreamcast
Boku, Doraemon

Game Gear
Doraemon: Wakuwaku Pocket Paradise
GG Doraemon: Nora no Suke no Yabou

PlayStation
Doraemon 2: SOS! Otogi no Kuni
Doraemon 3: Makai no Dungeon
Doraemon: Nobitaito Fukkatsu no Hoshi
Kids Station: Doraemon: Himitsu no Yojigen Pocket

PlayStation 4
Doraemon Story of Seasons

TurboGrafx 16
Doraemon: Meikyū Daisakusen
Doraemon Nobita no Dorabian Nights

TurboGrafx CD
Doraemon Nobita No Dorabian Nights

3DO
Doraemon Yuujou Densetsu

WonderSwan Color
Pocket no Chuu no Doraemon

Microsoft Windows (PC)
Doraemon Monopoly
Paso Pico: Doraemon: Nobita no Machinaka Doki Doki Tanken!
Paso Pico: Doraemon: Nobita to Himitsu Dougu o Mitsukeyou!
Paso Pico: Doraemon: Nobita to Maigo no Kyouryuu
Paso Pico: Doraemon: Time Machine de Daibouken!
Doraemon: Nobita's Ranch Story / Doraemon: Story of Seasons

iOS/Android
 Glico x Stand By Me Doraemon (discontinued)
Glico Coloring (discontinued)
Run Nobita Run
Doraemon Fishing 2 / Doraemon Fishing 2+ / Doraemon Fishing 2 HD / Doraemon Fishing 2 - Nobita's Dinosaur Adventure / Doraemon Fishing 2S / Doraemon Fat Cat Fishing / Doraemon Dino Fishing
Doraemon Gadget Rush
Doraemon MusicPad
Doraemon Repair Shop
Doraemon Repair Shop Seasons
Doraemon Comic World
Doraemon Doublixir
Doraemon Badge Blast
Doraemon Time Travel Dream
Nabati Petualangan Doraemon
Choi Choi Doraemon
Doraemon: Oyako de Sūji Asobi
Doraemon: Oyako de Kanji Asobi
 Disney Sorcerer’s Arena (upcoming legendary event)

Nintendo Switch
Doraemon: Nobita's Chronicle of the Moon Exploration
Doraemon: Nobita's Ranch Story / Doraemon: Story of Seasons

References

Doraemon video games
Doraemon video games
 
Doraemon video games
Video games